The Cançoner Vega-Aguiló is a chansonnier predominantly carrying Catalan and Occitan pieces, but also some Castilian and Middle French verse.

List of poets with pieces in the Vega-Aguiló

Bibliography
Anna Alberni Jordà (2003), "El cançoner Vega-Aguiló (BC, mss. 7 i 8): estructura i contingut," PhD thesis, University of Barcelona.

Chansonniers (books)